Adil Shamasdin and Lovro Zovko were the defending champions, but Shamasdin decided not to participate.
Zovko played alongside Dino Marcan. They reached the final, but Paolo Lorenzi and Júlio Silva defeated them 6–3, 6–2.

Seeds

Draw

Draw

References
 Main Draw

Rijeka Open - Doubles
Rijeka Open